The 2009 Porsche 250 Presented by Bradley Arant was the eighth round of the 2009 Rolex Sports Car Series season. It took place at Barber Motorsports Park on July 19, 2009.

Race results
Class Winners in bold.

Porsche 250